Borgen is a neighbourhood in the Vestre Aker borough in Oslo, Norway. In addition to being a residential area, Borgen is mostly known for Borgen station on the Oslo Metro which is located adjacent to Vestre gravlund.

References

Neighbourhoods of Oslo